Enniscorthy, is a historic home located at Ellicott City, Howard County, Maryland. It is a large Italianate-influenced frame house constructed about 1860.

It was listed on the National Register of Historic Places in 1986.

References

External links
, including photo from 1980, at Maryland Historical Trust

Houses completed in 1860
Italianate architecture in Maryland
Houses on the National Register of Historic Places in Maryland
Howard County, Maryland landmarks
Houses in Howard County, Maryland
Buildings and structures in Ellicott City, Maryland
National Register of Historic Places in Howard County, Maryland